Cryptocarya obovata is a species of laurel growing on basaltic and fertile alluvial soils in eastern Australian rainforests. It is found from Wyong (33° S) in New South Wales to Gympie (27° S) in the state of Queensland. Extinct in the Illawarra region (34° S), allegedly last seen in the Illawarra in 1818 by Allan Cunningham.  The species was included in the Prodromus Florae Novae Hollandiae et Insulae Van Diemen, 402 (1810)

Description 

Cryptocarya obovata, known as the pepperberry or white walnut, reaches a height of 40 metres and a trunk diameter of 90 cm. The hairy underside of the leaves gives the tree a rusty appearance when viewed from below.

Trunk, bark and leaves 

The trunk is straight and round in cross section, usually buttressed. The bark is grey or brown and usually fairly smooth. Vertical lines of pustules are often seen.

Leaves are alternate, obovate or oblong, 6 to 12 cm long, with a round tip. Upper surface smooth and glossy, underside usually greyish and finely hairy. Brown leaf stalks 3 to 8 mm long.

Leaf venation is prominent, the raised midrib, lateral and net veins are covered with brown hairs, standing out conspicuously. Veins brownish/orange or yellow in colour.

Flowers, fruit and germination 

Cream flowers in panicles. Individual flowers about 3 mm long, almost without stalks. Flowering occurs between February to May.

The fruit is a black globular drupe, usually ribbed. 12 mm in diameter. The seed is around 8 mm in diameter. Fruit ripe from March to May. Eaten by Australasian figbird, rose-crowned fruit-dove, topknot pigeon and wompoo fruit dove.

Like most Australian Cryptocarya fruit, removal of the fleshy aril is advised to assist seed germination, which is slow with Cryptocarya obovata After 205 days, a 50% germination success may be expected.

Gallery

References

External links

Laurales of Australia
Trees of Australia
Flora of New South Wales
Flora of Queensland
obovata
Plants described in 1810
Taxa named by Robert Brown (botanist, born 1773)